MV Arctic was an icebreaking cargo ship built in 1978 at the Port Weller Dry Docks in St. Catharines, Ontario, Canada. The ship was owned and operated by the Fednav Group. Arctic was sold for recycling in Aliağa, Turkey in April 2021.

Designed to carry both oil and ore, the vessel is not only ice strengthened with a Finnish-Swedish ice class 1A Super, but has a CASPPR Class 3 or CAC 4 rating. This means it is powerful enough to navigate through many ice-covered waters without escort.  Arctic previously serviced mines in the high Canadian Arctic such as Polaris and Nanisivik. Once those mines closed she was shifted to service the Raglan mine in northern Quebec and the Voisey's Bay mine in Labrador. In addition in 1985 she became the first ship to export crude oil from the Canadian Arctic, from Panarctic Oils Bent Horn terminal.

As part of the repairs following a grounding off of Little Cornwallis Island the ice strengthening in the sides and bottom was increased at Thunder Bay shipyard in 1984. In 1985-1986 in anticipation of the export of crude oil from Bent Horn Island in the high Arctic the ship received a new icebreaker bow and was converted to an OBO at Port Weller Drydock. This improved her icebreaking capability such that the ice class could be upgraded from CAC 2 to CAC 4.

References

www.shipbuildinghistory.com/history/canadayards/portarthur.htm   C17 348357 Arctic Fednav Ltd. Bulk Carrier 19,420 Jul-85 Conversion to OBO Carrier

Icebreakers of Canada
Transport in the Arctic